In common usage, the Finnish word rautalanka (literally "iron wire", referring to the strings of the electric guitar) means instrumental rock in general.  Some enthusiasts use the term more narrowly to refer to the somewhat distinct style of music that emerged in Finland in the 1960s. This article is written from that more narrow point of view.

Rautalanka is typically played by a quartet consisting of a lead guitar, rhythm guitar, bass guitar and drum kit. Rautalanka music can also include other instruments and vocals. The heyday of rautalanka was in the early 1960s, but it has enthusiasts to this day. Typical features of rautalanka are sharp and clear melodies, fast tempos and extensive use of tape echo, but little or no overdrive or fuzz. Very typical rhythm is the Twist-beat. What distinguishes rautalanka most clearly from other twangy guitar genres is that melodies tend to be in minor keys and melancholic, based on folk tunes and schlager songs.

History
Rautalanka emerged in the early 1960s. The Finnish national broadcasting company Yleisradio had a monopoly on radio in Finland and played little in the way of pop music. However, foreign radio stations played pop music around that time. Those stations were eagerly listened to in Finland, the most popular being Radio Luxembourg. It aired guitar music, which prompted the Finnish youth to set up bands and play this music. Bands such as The Shadows and The Ventures served as examples for rautalanka bands.

Rautalanka was the first youth-oriented style of music, played by young people, to receive mass distribution in Finland. Before rautalanka, music recording and live performing had been more or less monopolized by (often older) professional musicians.

The golden age of rautalanka in Finland lasted from early 1961 to late 1963, at which point the interest of youth at large shifted away from the Finnish style to merseybeat, led by The Beatles. While instrumental rock music was popular all around Europe, the term  rautalanka is used only in Finland, Sweden (taggtråd) and Norway (piggtråd). It refers to instrumental music which is too melodic and clean to be true rock music, but also too rhythmic to be folk music.

Worldwide, the best known representative of this style is the British band The Shadows, who have visited Finland several times, most recently in 2009. Their best known song is "Apache". Their American counterparts are The Ventures, whose song "Walk, Don't Run" was a hit in Finland and used by Yleisradio as their theme melody. The first real Finnish rautalanka hit was "Emma" by The Sounds, which became the image of Finnish rautalanka music. Many bands employed folk music and other styles of popular music as inspiration for their musical pieces.  While rock music eventually superseded both Merseybeat and rautalanka in Finnish youth culture, the style survived as background music for many Finnish popular music performers, and Hank Marvin has been the example for many modern Finnish rock musicians.

Style 

The essential hallmark of rautalanka sound is a strong lead guitar, usually a Fender Stratocaster (or its clone) with single coil pickups and tape echo guitar effect (in contrast to the spring reverb style echo used in surf music). Genuine tape echo devices are used often, and many bands do not use digital effects out of respect to the traditions.

The traditions of rautalanka music in Finland are strong, and some of the most persistent traditions are:

 Rautalanka is a highly do-it-yourself music. Many rautalanka artists build their own custom guitars and amplifiers
 The music is very melodic, and the rhythm section only supports the lead guitar.
 Melodies tend to be melancholic and in minor keys.
 The names of rautalanka bands usually are English language plurals ending in letter 's', although there are exceptions. This is inherited from foreign groups such as The Shadows and The Ventures.
 Many rautalanka bands use uniform stage costumes in 1960s style.
 The lead guitar is prominent, melodies are crisp and stark, and the guitar playing style can be almost virtuosic.
 Overdrive and distortion are avoided, but tape echo is employed extensively.
 Any singer almost always plays the bass or rhythm guitar.

While traditional rautalanka is today a marginal musical genre, followed by relatively small but enthusiastic circles, it didn't cease to exist in 1964. It has formed the basis for the whole of Finnish youth music, and the strong melodic heavy metal tradition in Finland has its roots in rautalanka guitar work. It is performed today not only as instrumental, but it has also been combined with popular and dance music, not the least because of the work of Topi Sorsakoski & Agents in the 1980s. The strong, echoing electric guitar in Finnish dance orchestras may today be more a rule than an exception.

Bands

Finland
 Viikate
 The Beatfox
 The Charades
 The Ironwire
 The Saints
 The Strangers
 The Steelers
 The Spectre
 The Sounds
 The Mutants
 Danny and the Islanders
 Agents
 Beatmakers
 Laika & the Cosmonauts
 The Regents
 The Mustangs
 The Quiets
 The Twangers
 The Youngers
 The Scaffolds

Elsewhere
 The Shadows
 The Ventures

See also
 Surf music
 Mersey beat
 Instrumental rock

External links
 Rautalanka.org, Finnish rautalanka musicians' pages
 Rautalankamusiikin Ystävät RAMY r.y. Friends of Rautalanka Music

Finnish music
Popular music
Instrumental rock
Finnish words and phrases